Samhain III: November-Coming-Fire is the second studio album by American deathrock band Samhain. It was released in February 1986, through lead singer Glenn Danzig's independent record label, Plan 9.

Background 

November-Coming-Fire was Samhain's last album before Danzig signed the group to Def American Recordings and changed the band name to Danzig. The album contains a re-recorded version of "Halloween II" by Glenn Danzig's previous band, the Misfits.

Track listing

Legacy 

AllMusic wrote that the album "continues to be an influence for both punk and thrash bands". The track "Mother of Mercy" was featured in the 2009 video game Guitar Hero: Metallica.
Metallica co-founder James Hetfield lists November-Coming-Fire as one of his top ten albums of all time.

Personnel 

 Glenn Danzig – vocals, keyboards, drums on tracks 1, 4, 6, 8 and 11
 Eerie Von – bass guitar, background vocals
 Pete "Damien" Marshall – guitar, background vocals
 London May – drums on tracks 2-3, 5, 7 and 9, background vocals

 Technical

 Bob Allecca – engineering
 Pa – cutting

References

External links 

 

Samhain (band) albums
1986 albums
Albums produced by Glenn Danzig
Plan 9 Records albums